Bentley Bridge Leisure Park is an extensive modern leisure/retail park located in the Wednesfield area of Wolverhampton in the West Midlands. It has been developed since the late 1990s, to the south of Wednesfield town centre.

The park is split into two halves − a leisure area and a shopping area.

The site is bounded by the Wyrley and Essington Canal and New Cross Hospital to the North and West, the recently built Wolverhampton Swimming and Fitness Centre to the South and Wednesfield Town  to the East, which is easily accessed via a village link, consisting of an open plan amphitheatre style square, landscaped lawns and the newly built Wednesfield library.

The first retailer to open was The Co-operative Food (owned by the then West Midlands Co-operative Society) but this was sold to Sainsbury's a few years later who subsequently expanded and refurbished the store.

History
In 2009, a plan was made to develop land adjacent to the Leisure park, which saw the creation of Bentley Bridge Business Park. Tenants include: Euro Carparts, Tool Station, Donghua (UK) Ltd, Wolverhampton City Primary Care Trust, Principal Hygiene Systems and a Mercedes Van and Truck dealership.

TK Maxx opened a department store on the retail park on 27 October 2011, replacing its decade-old city centre store which had closed the previous day.

In late 2014, Costa Coffee opened a new store in a previously vacant unit near Cosmo and B & M.

Stores

Main Stores

 Cineworld
 Hollywood Bowl
 Boots
 Argos Extra
 Aldi
 Dreams
 Sports Direct
 Next
 Home Bargains
 Sainsbury's
 B & M

 Card Factory
 Peacocks
 Hobbycraft

 Pure Gym
 TK Maxx
 JD Sports
 Just for Pets

=Restaurants and Cafés
 Bella Italia
 Subway
 Nandos
 McDonald's
 KFC

 Starbucks 

It’s an okay retail park but wouldn’t recommend fully

References

External links
 Bentley Bridge Retail Park on CompletelyRetail.co.uk
 Bentley Bridge Leisure Park's Website

Shopping centres in the West Midlands (county)
Wolverhampton
Retail parks in the United Kingdom
Tourist attractions in Wolverhampton